Sublime is an unincorporated community in Lavaca County, Texas, United States. Sublime has a post office with the ZIP code 77986.

Gallery

References

External links

Unincorporated communities in Lavaca County, Texas
Unincorporated communities in Texas